Hanno Melzer is a German rower. He competed for the SG Dynamo Potsdam / Sportvereinigung (SV) Dynamo and won medals at international rowing competitions.

References 

German male rowers
Living people
Year of birth missing (living people)
World Rowing Championships medalists for East Germany